Mahmoud Khaldi is a Paralympian athlete from Tunisia competing mainly in category P12 pentathlon events.

He competed in the 2008 Summer Paralympics in Beijing, China.  There he won a bronze medal in the men's Pentathlon - P12 event and went out in the quarter-finals of the men's 400 metres - T12 event

Athletics
Men's 200m - T12

Men's 400m - T12

External links
 

Year of birth missing (living people)
Living people
Paralympic athletes of Tunisia
Athletes (track and field) at the 2008 Summer Paralympics
Paralympic bronze medalists for Tunisia
World record holders in Paralympic athletics
Medalists at the 2008 Summer Paralympics
Athletes (track and field) at the 2012 Summer Paralympics
Medalists at the 2012 Summer Paralympics
Paralympic gold medalists for Tunisia
African Games silver medalists for Tunisia
African Games medalists in athletics (track and field)
Athletes (track and field) at the 2011 All-Africa Games
Paralympic medalists in athletics (track and field)
Tunisian male sprinters
21st-century Tunisian people